English is the predominant language and a de facto official language of New Zealand. Almost the entire population speak it either as native speakers or proficiently as a second language. The New Zealand English dialect is most similar to Australian English in pronunciation, with some key differences. The Māori language of the indigenous Māori people was made the first de jure official language in 1987. New Zealand Sign Language (NZSL) has been an official language since 2006. Many other languages are used by New Zealand's minority ethnic communities.

Official languages
New Zealand has three official languages: English (de facto), Māori and New Zealand Sign Language.

Otago Law Professor Andrew Geddis explains the context of official languages:
English is already a de facto official language, which may be used in any or all public or official contexts. (...) [W]e legislated [Māori] and sign language as being "official languages", in order to affirmatively grant the right to use them in particular, specified situations where they otherwise could not be used. This is not the case with English. It's simply a general, background cultural presumption in our particular society that this is the language of our government. (...) English is so much an "official language" that our law actually specifies in various places it must be used in place of any other.

English

English is the most common language, spoken by 95.4 percent of those who completed the relevant 2018 national census question. It has long been the predominant language and the de facto official language. It is the primary language used in parliament, government, the courts, and the education system. Its official status has been presumed and is not codified in statute. In 2018, New Zealand First MP Clayton Mitchell introduced a bill to parliament to statutorily recognise English as an official language.

New Zealand English is mostly non-rhotic with the exception of the "southern burr" found principally in Southland and parts of Otago. It is similar to Australian English and many speakers from the Northern Hemisphere are unable to tell the two accents apart. In New Zealand English the short ⟨i⟩ (as in kit) has become centralised, leading to the shibboleth fish and chips sounding like "fush and chups" to the Australian ear. The words rarely and really, reel and real, doll and dole, pull and pool, witch and which, and full and fill can sometimes be pronounced as homophones. New Zealand English exhibits the near–square merger, so hair, hare, hear and here are sometimes homophones. Some New Zealanders pronounce the past participles grown, thrown and mown using two syllables, whereas groan, throne and moan are pronounced as one syllable. New Zealanders often reply to a question or emphasise a point by adding a rising intonation at the end of the sentence. New Zealand English has also borrowed words and phrases from Māori, such as haka (war dance), kia ora (a greeting), mana (power or prestige), puku (stomach), taonga (treasure) and waka (canoe).

Māori

The Māori language of the indigenous Māori people has been an official language by statute since 1987, with rights and obligations to use it defined by the Maori Language Act 1987. It can, for example, be used in legal settings, such as in court, but proceedings are recorded in only in English, unless private arrangements are made and agreed by the judge.

An Eastern Polynesian language, Māori is closely related to Tahitian and Cook Islands Māori. After the Second World War, Māori were discouraged from speaking their language in schools and workplaces and it existed as a community language only in a few remote areas. As a consequence of this, many Māori came to view te reo Māori as a language without purpose and chose not to teach their children. Since the 1970s, the language has undergone a process of revitalisation and is spoken by a larger number of people.  Of the 185,955 people (4.0 percent of respondents) who claimed they could hold a conversation in Māori in the 2018 census, 86.2 percent identified as Māori, but, conversely, only 18.4 percent of Māori-identifying spoke te reo Māori. No adult Māori alive in New Zealand today does not also speak English.

New Zealand Sign Language

New Zealand Sign Language, the main language of the deaf community in New Zealand, has been an official language by statute since 2006, by virtue of the New Zealand Sign Language Act 2006. It is legal to use it and have access to it in legal proceedings and government services. In the 2018 census, 22,986 people (0.5%) reported the ability to use New Zealand Sign Language.

Immigrant languages

New Zealand has immigrants from European, Asian and Pacific Island countries who have brought their languages with them. According to Ethnologue, the largest groups are Samoan (86,400), Hindi (66,300), Mandarin Chinese (52,300), French (49,100) and Yue Chinese (44,600). These minority foreign languages are concentrated in the main cities, particularly Auckland where recent immigrant groups have settled. In the 2018 census, 115,830 respondents who spoke at least one language did not include English as one of their spoken languages.

The number and proportion of multilingual people (those who can speak two or more languages) has continued to increase since the 2001 census. In the 2018 census, the number of multilingual people was 946,275, or 20.6 percent of respondents who spoke at least one language. The highest proportions of multilingual speakers lived in the Auckland (30.9%) and Wellington (21.2%) regions.

Statistics
In the 2018 census, the following languages were reportedly spoken by more than 0.1 percent of the population. People could report more than one language, therefore percentages do not add up to 100. Statistics include those who spoke no language (e.g. too young to talk).

Regional breakdown 
According to the 2018 census, English is the most-spoken language in every district of New Zealand. Māori is the second-most spoken language in 60 of the 67 cities and districts of New Zealand. The second-most spoken languages in the remaining seven cities and districts are:

 Samoan is the second-most spoken language in Auckland and Porirua city.
 French is the second-most spoken language in Wellington city.
 Tagalog is the second-most spoken language in the Ashburton district.
 German is the second-most spoken language in the Tasman district.
 Spanish is the second-most spoken language in the Mackenzie and Queenstown-Lakes districts.

See also
 Cook Islands Māori and Pukapukan – spoken in the New Zealand associated state of the Cook Islands
 Moriori language – formerly spoken in New Zealand's Chatham Islands
 Niuean language – spoken in the New Zealand associated state of Niue
 Tokelauan language – spoken in the New Zealand dependent territory of Tokelau
 List of territorial entities where English is an official language

Footnotes

Bibliography

External links
 Languages of New Zealand at Ethnologue: Languages of the World